Juhan Vilms (22 September 1893 Kabala Parish, Viljandi County – 22 February 1952 Buenos Aires) was an Estonian politician. He was a member of IV Riigikogu.

References

1893 births
1952 deaths
Members of the Riigikogu, 1929–1932